Bandalised is a 1994 folk music album by Vin Garbutt.

Track listing
 England My England
 The Catholic Boy/Imelda Rolands Reel/The Green Gates
 Jessie the Flower of Dunblane
 The Humours of Twizziegill/Hitler's Downfall/The Rambling Pitchfork
 Be as Children
 The Reluctant Hedgehog/The Mooncoin Reel
 Lough Sheelin Side
 Michelle Flynn's Hornpipe/The Squeaky Chair/The Willow Tree
 Philipino Maid
 The Wilderness Road
 The Songbird
 The Copperplate Jig/Ann Bewick's Pies/The Virginia Reel
 The Rose of Tralee
 The Blackbird Hornpipe/The Other Fairy Hornpipe/The Hummersea Slide
 Reprise: The Wilderness Road

1994 albums
Vin Garbutt albums